The forty or so Plateau languages are a tentative group of Benue–Congo languages spoken by 15 million people on the Jos Plateau, Southern Kaduna, Nasarawa State and in adjacent areas in central Nigeria.

Berom and Eggon have the most speakers. Most Plateau languages are threatened and have around 2,000-10,000 speakers.

Defining features of the Plateau family have only been published in manuscript form (Blench 2008). Many of the languages have highly elaborate phonology systems that make comparison with poor data difficult.

Branches and locations
Below is a list of major Plateau branches and their primary locations (centres of diversity) based on Blench (2019).

The Plateau languages are highly typologically and lexically diverse. For instance, Roger Blench (2022) notes that Beromic is more internally diverse than all of West Chadic A3.

Classification
Little work has been done on the Plateau languages, and the results to date are tentative.

Blench (2018)
Blench (2018:112) gives the following classification of the Plateau languages.

Blench (2008)
The following classification is taken from Blench (2008). Most of the branches are discrete constituents, though Central is a residual grouping and there are doubts about some of the purported Ninzic languages. Plateau languages as a whole share a number of isoglosses, as do all branches apart from Tarokoid.

Glottolog adds the Yukubenic languages. Blench, however, places Yukubenic in the Jukunoid family, following Shimizu (1980).

Gerhardt (1983)
Classification of Plateau languages by Gerhardt (1983), based on Maddieson (1972):

Plateau 1a, 1b (Kainji languages)
Plateau 2
Yeskwa, Lungu, Koro
Kamanton, Kagoma, Jaba cluster, Nandu-Tari
Afuzare, Kaje, Iregwe
Kagoro, Ataka, Katab (including Kachicheri, Kafanchan), Marwa
Kadara, Kuturmi, Ikulu, Idong, Doka, Iku-Gora-Ankwa
Plateau 3
Migili (?, L. G.)
Birom (including Aboro, Afango)
Aten
Plateau 4
Ayu
Kwanka-Boi-Bijim-Shall-Zwall
Ninzam, Mada, Gwantu, Numana-Nunku, Nindem, Kaningkon, Kanufi
Rukuba
Plateau 5
Yashi
Eggon, Nungu, Ake, Jidda-Abu
Plateau 6
Pyam
Horom
Plateau 7
Tarok (= Yergam)
Bashar
Pai
Plateau 8
Mabo-Barkul
Plateau 9
Eloyi
Plateau 10
Turkwam, Arum-Chesu

Note: Plateau 1 languages, consisting of Plateau 1a and 1b, are now classified separately as Kainji languages.

Language list
List of Plateau languages given by Blench (2018):

Northwest
Eda
Edra
Acro
Obiro
Kulu
Ẹjẹgha (Idon)
Doka
Ẹhwa (Iku-Gora-Ankwe)

Beromic
Berom
Cara
Iten
Shall-Zwall

West-Central (area)

Izeric
Izere of Fobur
Icèn, Ganàng, Fəràn
Rigwe
Southern Zaria (now Southern Kaduna)
Tyapic
Jju
Tyap
Gworok
Takad (Attakar)
Tyecarak (Kacicere)
Sholyio
Fantswam (Kafancan)
Tyuku
Koro
Ashe
Tinɔr (Waci-Myamya)
Idũ, Gwara
Nyankpa-Barde
Hyamic
Shamang
Cori
Hyam
Zhire
Shang
Gyongic
Gyong (Kagoma)
Nɡhan (Kamanton)

Ninzic
Ninzo
Ce
Bu-Niŋkada
Mada
Numana-Nunku-Gwantu-Numbu
Ningye-Ninka
Anib
Ninkyob
Nindem
Nungu
Ayu

Ndunic
Ndun (Tari)

Alumic
Toro, Alumu-Təsu
Hasha
Sambe

Southern
Eggonic
Eggon
Ake
Jilic
Jili
Jijili

Southeastern (?)
Fyem
Horom
Bo-Rukul

Tarokoid
Tarok
Pe (Pai)
Kwang-Ya-Bijim-Legeri
Yaŋkam (Bashar)
Sur (Tapshin)

Eloyi

Nisam is a presumed Plateau language once spoken in Nince Village, Kaduna State, but its place within the Plateau branch cannot be ascertained due to the lack of linguistic data. In 2005, there was only one speaker of Nisam.

Morphology
Proto-Plateau nominal prefixes:

 *ni- (corresponding to Bantu noun class 9 *n- for animals and inanimate objects)
 *V- for person, *bV- for people
 *N- prefixes, homorganic with the following consonant
 *nV- ~ *mV- (both singular and plural), which mark liquids, mass nouns, and abstract nouns

Only some of the languages have nominal classes, as the Bantu languages have, where in others these have eroded. In many Plateau languages, many CV- prefixes have become fossilised, replaced by V- prefixes, or disappeared altogether. The large numbers of consonants in many languages is due to the erosion of noun-class prefixes.

In Plateau languages, adjectives and possessive forms generally follow the noun.

Reconstructions
Some Proto-Plateau quasi-reconstructions proposed by Roger Blench (2008) are:

Numerals
Comparison of numerals in individual languages:

See also
List of Plateau reconstructions (Wiktionary)
 Systematic graphic of the Niger–Congo language family

Footnotes

References
Blench (2008) Prospecting proto-Plateau. Manuscript.

External links
Plateau materials from Roger Blench
ComparaLex, database with Plateau word lists